Organizational change fatigue or change fatigue is a general sense of apathy or passive resignation towards organizational changes by individuals or teams. Organizational change efforts are all too often unfocused, uninspired and unsuccessful.

Overview 
Organizational change fatigue has become a chronic problem facing companies in today's world of constant, concurrent and often competing changes. To successfully deploy and adopt change, organizational change fatigue often represents the single greatest risk for an organization. However, companies can combat and overcome organizational change fatigue.

Constant and concurrent change 
Most organizations are constantly undergoing some form of change, either locally, regionally or globally. However, as humans, we inherently need stability, order and predictability, essentially our need to maintain a sense of status quo. Organizational changes often directly challenge the status quo, creating resistance and conflict. When change is always occurring, individuals begin to become overwhelmed, their ability to adapt becomes depleted, and the loss of control and uncertainty skyrocket. So, individuals are unable to align their thoughts and actions because they are always changing.  
 
Organizations that plan and manage change thoughtfully and with long-term goals in mind make a point of providing a clear start point, an unambiguous transition phase, and a clear goal (endpoint) for each change undertaken. Only via such a careful approach will fears be reduced—and thus individuals will become able to comfortably cope with each change.

See also

 Ambidextrous organization
 Change management
 Collaboration
 Group dynamics
 Group development
 Groupthink
 Industrial and organizational psychology
 Knowledge management
 Managing change
 Organizational communication
 Organizational climate
 Organizational culture
 Organizational diagnostics
 Organizational engineering
 Organizational learning
 Organizational performance
 Performance improvement
 Team building
 Team composition

References

Further reading
 
 
 
 Turner, Dawn-Marie (2015),  Launch Lead Live: The executive's guide to preventing resistance and succeeding with organizational change, YNWP.

Management theory